Mainspring is the third novel from writer Jay Lake. It is a clockpunk science fiction novel.

This novel is followed by the 2008 sequel Escapement and the 2010 sequel Pinion.

Plot summary
Mainspring is the story of a young clockmaker's apprentice, who is visited by the Archangel Gabriel. He is told that he must take the Key Perilous and rewind the mainspring of the Earth. It is running down, and disaster to the planet will ensue if it's not rewound. From innocence and ignorance to power and self-knowledge, the young man will make the long and perilous journey to the South Polar Axis, to fulfill the commandment of his God.

American steampunk novels
2007 American novels
American science fiction novels
American alternate history novels
Tor Books books